Brandis Kemp (February 1, 1944 – July 4, 2020) was an American actress best known for her appearances in Fridays and  AfterMASH from the years 1980 to 1985. She then appeared in a wide variety of films and TV shows as a character actress for the remainder of her career.

Early life
She grew up in Palo Alto, California, and attended three colleges: San Jose State College, Stanford University (where she earned a master's degree in drama and literature) and the American Conservatory Theater. She battled dyslexia throughout her school years. After college she spent a year in Hawaii, then to Oregon where she met future Fridays' cast member and future husband Mark Blankfield at the Oregon Shakespeare Festival. She then moved to New York for five years. Her first job in New York was teaching speech to policemen and firemen at the John Jay College of Criminal Justice. In 1979 she moved to Los Angeles just before Fridays broke.

Theatre

She performed onstage in such productions as Meetin' On The Porch (The Canon Theatre), A Man's A Man (La Jolla Playhouse), Look Homeward, Angel (Pasadena Playhouse), Women Behind Bars (Roxy Theatre), Bullshot Crummond (Westwood Playhouse, Coronet Theatre and National Tour), and El Grande de Coca-Cola (Studio One). She worked with the Stanford Repertory Theatre (2 seasons) and the Oregon Shakespeare Festival (1 season).

Fridays
Producers of the TV show caught her performances as part of the Low Moan Spectacular comedy troupe in the plays "Bullshot Crummond" and "El Grande de Coca Cola" and selected her as a member of their new ensemble cast.

In 1980, she developed strong comedic recurring characters such as the "Creative Palm Reader" as well as adding her talents to comedy sketches on many levels. She became the "go to" female cast member because of her flexibility and strong delivery (much like Laraine Newman on Saturday Night Live). She co-starred with Mark Blankfield (to whom she was married until 1987), Jack Burns, Maryedith Burrell, Melanie Chartoff, Larry David, Rich Hall, Bruce Mahler, and Michael Richards. The show lasted two seasons, ending in 1982.

AfterMASH
Producers of the TV show caught her six-month performance in the stage comedy "Women Behind Bars" and liked the character she was playing. She was playing an assistant to the prison matron. It was similar to the Alma Cox character they were creating for the TV show. She started the TV show as an occasionally recurring character but after only four episodes she quickly graduated to a regular cast member because of the popularity of Alma Cox. After the first 13 episodes she appeared in every episode. She appeared with David Ackroyd, Rosalind Chao, William Christopher, Patrick Cranshaw, Jamie Farr, Peter Michael Goetz, Harry Morgan, Anne Pitoniak, and Jay O. Sanders. The show completed its run in 1985.

Death
Kemp died at her home in the Los Feliz section of Los Angeles on July 4, 2020, following a struggle with brain cancer and complications from COVID-19 during the COVID-19 pandemic in Los Angeles. She was 76 years old.

Filmography

References

External links
 

American film actresses
American television actresses
Actresses from California
American women comedians
Actresses from Palo Alto, California
1944 births
2020 deaths
American sketch comedians
Comedians from California
Deaths from brain cancer in the United States
Deaths from the COVID-19 pandemic in California
Deaths from cancer in California
People from Los Feliz, Los Angeles